Ross Carr is a former Senior Gaelic football manager and former inter-county player for Down. Carr had previously managed the Down Minor Football team in 2003 and 2004.

Carr was assisted by DJ Kane, Declan Mussen and Michael Doyle during his management period at Down. Carr won two All-Ireland medals with the Mourne county in 1991 and 1994. Carr finished as top scorer in the Ulster senior football championship of 1991,scoring 21 points over all he scored 30 points and also won an All-Star award at right half-forward that same year. Carr previously managed Co Monaghan side Castleblayney Faughs.

Honours
 5 Dr McKenna Cup 1987 1989 1992 1996 1998
 2 Ulster Senior Football Championship 1991 1994
 2 All-Ireland Senior Football Championship 1991 1994
 2 Ulster Senior Football Championship 1991 1994
 1 Down Senior Football Championship 2000 C
 1 National Football League Division 2 1988
 1 National Football League Division 3 1997
 1 Ulster Minor Football Championship 1983
 1 Ulster Under-21 Football Championship 1984 
 1 All Star Awards 1991
 1 Irish News Ulster All-Stars 1998

External links
 Appointment as Manager
 Appointment as Manager

Year of birth missing (living people)
Living people
Gaelic football managers
Clonduff Gaelic footballers
Down inter-county Gaelic footballers
Winners of two All-Ireland medals (Gaelic football)